Arnold Moon Sullivan (30 August 1878 – 27 June 1943) was an English cricketer. Sullivan was a right-handed batsman who occasionally fielded as a wicket-keeper. He was born at Kirkbymoorside, Yorkshire.

While studying at Christ's College, Cambridge, Sullivan made his first-class debut for Cambridge University against AJ Webbe's XI in 1899. He made eight further first-class appearances for the university, the last of which came against the Marylebone Cricket Club in 1900. In his nine first-class matches for the university, he scored 313 runs at an average of 19.56, with a high score of 63. He made two half centuries, with both coming against Surrey in 1900 at Fenner's. In the 1901 County Championship, he played first-class cricket for Sussex, making four appearances against Somerset, Lancashire, Hampshire and Yorkshire.

He died at Meads, Sussex, on 27 June 1943.

References

External links
Arnold Sullivan at ESPNcricinfo
Arnold Sullivan at CricketArchive

1878 births
1943 deaths
People from Ryedale (district)
Alumni of Christ's College, Cambridge
English cricketers
Cambridge University cricketers
Sussex cricketers
Sportspeople from Yorkshire